White Shadows (German: Weiße Schatten) is a 1951 West German drama film directed by  Helmut Käutner  and starring  Hilde Krahl, Hans Söhnker and Claude Farell.

The film's sets were designed by Fritz Moegle. Much of the film was shot on location in Tyrol.

Cast
   Hilde Krahl  as Ruth  
 Hans Söhnker  as Richard  
 Claude Farell   as Hella  
 Hugo Gottschlich  as Toni  
 Hermann Erhardt  as Älterer Grenzer  
 Franz Muxeneder  as Junger Grenzer  
 Otto Bolesch  as Der Fremde

References

Bibliography 
 Hans-Michael Bock and Tim Bergfelder. The Concise Cinegraph: An Encyclopedia of German Cinema. Berghahn Books, 2009.

External links 
 

1951 films
1951 drama films
German drama films
West German films
1950s German-language films
Films directed by Helmut Käutner
Films set in the Alps
German black-and-white films
1950s German films